Utah State Route 97 is a state highway in the U.S. state of Utah. It is a  road in Weber County, starting as a minor arterial in the west and increasing to a major collector road in the east that runs from Hooper through Roy to the northwest gate of Hill Air Force Base.

Route description
The route's western terminus is in Hooper at the intersection of SR-37 (5900 West) and 5500 South. From here it travels east as 5500 South towards Roy. It continues to the east through Roy, through an interchange with I-15, and ends just east of the interstate at the Hill Air Force Base northwest gate.

History
State Route 97 was originally created in 1965 as a short major access road between SR-106/US-91 (now I-15) and Hill Air Force Base. In 1969, it was extended westward  along 5600 South to SR-108 (3500 West).

From 1969 to 2000, State Route 98 ran on 5500 South from SR-37 (5900 West) in Hooper to SR-108. This put its eastern terminus just one block north of the western terminus of SR-97. By 2000, a construction project was completed that connected the two roads at a common intersection by shifting the east end of SR-98 south by a block. In response, the state legislature consolidated the two routes by deleting SR-98 and transferring it to SR-97, resulting in the current alignment.

Major intersections

References

External links

 097
097
State Route 97